Odour of Chrysanthemums is a 2002 short film directed by Mark Partridge and based on the short story by D. H. Lawrence.

Plot 
The film tells of a Nottinghamshire coalminer's wife, a young mother, waiting for her husband Walter to come home. She blames his drinking for his absence. It later turns out he has been killed in a pit accident.

Laying out his corpse, after it is brought home from the mine, makes her realize they never really knew each other. Upon the discovery that her husband has died, the protagonist, Elizabeth, is able to remain astonishingly calm and collected, especially in front of her children. In contrast, Walter's mother, who lives near the young couple and their children, becomes deeply emotional.

The presence of pink chrysanthemums throughout the story represents Elizabeth's constant desire for some hint of beauty within her life. One of the miners who brings in Walter's body knocks over the vase of flowers, symbolizing Elizabeth's loss of control over her life.

Cast 
Geraldine O'Rawe as Elizabeth Bates
Geraldine James as Grandma Bates
Jake Smith (as Jake McCollough) as John Bates
Florence Romney-Scriven as Annie Bates
Bruce Alexander as Elizabeth's Father

Crew 
Director - Mark Partridge 
Producer - Andrea Wallace Grant
Set Nurse - Helen Smith
Costume Designer - Wyn Humphreys
Composer - Stephen Daltry

Awards 
The Film won First Prize in the short film category of the Milan Film Festival.

External links 
IMDB
Milan Film Festival

2002 films
2002 short films
British short films
Films based on short fiction
Films based on works by D. H. Lawrence
2000s English-language films